Arianne Hartono and Olivia Tjandramulia were the defending champions, but chose not to participate.

Top seeds Yana Sizikova and Aldila Sutjiadi won the title, defeating Mayar Sherif and Tamara Zidanšek in the final, 6–1, 3–6, [10–7].

Seeds

Draw

Draw

References

External links 
Main Draw

Copa LP Chile - Doubles